Parolinia intermedia is a species of flowering plants in the family Brassicaceae.

References

Brassicaceae
Flora of the Canary Islands